Mesoponera melanaria, is a species of ant of the subfamily Ponerinae. 2 subspecies recognized.

Subspecies
 Mesoponera melanaria macra Emery, 1894 - Seychelles
 Mesoponera melanaria melanaria(Emery, 1893) - Seychelles, India, Sri Lanka, China

References

Animaldiversity.org
Itis.org

External links

 at antwiki.org

Ponerinae
Hymenoptera of Asia
Insects described in 1893